The Saint James the Great Parish Church is a Spanish colonial church located at Brgy. Germinal in Bolinao, Pangasinan, Philippines. The church was made out of black coral stones. The church underwent series of natural and man-made calamities, such as the 1788 earthquake, 1819 fire incident, and Typhoon Emong in 2009.

History
The first religious friars in Bolinao were the Augustinians who stayed in the town from 1585 to 1587. The Dominicans took charge from 1588 to 1599. In 1600, the Augustinians returned and stayed until 1607. The missionary work left by the Augustinians were taken over by the Augustinian Recollects who administered the town from 1609 to 1679, up to 1712 when the Dominicans took over again. When the Recollects returned in 1609, they transferred the town to the mainland because of the troubles inflicted by the piratical raids. The Recollect fathers returned in 1749 and took charge until 1784. Since then, several priests administered the parish.

The church tower of Bolinao used to be the tallest in Pangasinan until an earthquake destroyed half of the tower in 1788. The church convent was accidentally burned in 1819.

The first priest was ordained in Bolinao Church in 1974. In 1985, it became a parish of the Diocese of Alaminos, previously being under the Diocese of Lingayen.

On May 7, 2009, the church was heavily devastated by Typhoon Emong and has since then been undergoing repairs and renovations.

Former Parish Priests

Architectural features
Saint James the Great Parish is in High Renaissance style. One feature of the church is its trefoil arch main door. The overall design of the facade is plain and simple with the super-positioned columns alternating with window openings and tall blind arches conspicuously dominating the ends of the walls.

Present condition
In front of the church is a marker stating that the first Mass on Philippine soil was celebrated in Bolinao Bay in 1324 by a Franciscan missionary, Blessed Odorico. However, Bl. Odoric being in the Philippines is highly doubted by scholars. Further, the National Historical Institute recognized the historical records of Limasawa in Southern Leyte as the venue of the first Mass, held on March 31, 1521.

Marker from the Saint James the Great Parish Church

In popular culture
The town center of the Saint James the Great Parish Church in Bolinao, Pangasinan was one of the Miniland models featured at the Legoland Malaysia Resort. It was the only Philippine town featured at the said park.

References

External links

Roman Catholic churches in Pangasinan
Churches in the Roman Catholic Diocese of Alaminos